Primula carniolica is a flowering plant in the primrose family known by the common name Carniolan primrose. It is endemic to Slovenia.

Description
The stem, base and leaves are clear green, fleshy and lack the coating that can be seen in some other primroses. They give away fragrance and have a slight coating of white particles in the throat. The plant flowers between April and May.

It has been a protected species in Slovenia since 1922 and it is consequentially forbidden to pick the flowers. Primula carniolica is rarely cultivated.

References

External links

Flora of Slovenia
carniolica
Taxa named by Nikolaus Joseph von Jacquin